Toimi Alatalo (4 April 1929 – 28 April 2014) was a Finnish cross-country skier who competed in the late 1950s and early 1960s. He won a gold medal at the 1960 Winter Olympics in Squaw Valley in the 4 × 10 km relay.

Cross-country skiing results

Olympic Games
 1 medal – (1 gold)

References

External links
Finland's 1960 Winter Olympic medals 

1929 births
2014 deaths
Finnish male cross-country skiers
Cross-country skiers at the 1960 Winter Olympics
Olympic medalists in cross-country skiing
Medalists at the 1960 Winter Olympics
Olympic gold medalists for Finland
20th-century Finnish people